The 2020 CONCACAF Women's Olympic Qualifying Championship was an international football tournament that was hold in the United States from 28 January to 9 February 2020. The eight national teams involved in the tournament were required to register a squad of 20 players, including three goalkeepers. Only players in these squads were eligible to take part in the tournament.

A provisional list of players was published CONCACAF on 10 January 2020, with a maximum of 50 players per national team. From the preliminary squad, the final list of 20 players per national team was submitted to CONCACAF by 21 January, one week prior to the opening match of the tournament. Teams are permitted to make late replacements in the event of serious injury, at any time up to 24 hours before their first match, where the replacement players are required to be from the preliminary squad.

The age listed for each player is on 28 January 2020, the first day of the tournament. The numbers of caps and goals listed for each player do not include any matches played after the start of the tournament. The club listed is the club for which the player last played a competitive match prior to the tournament. A flag is included for coaches who are of a different nationality than their own national team.

Group A

Costa Rica
Head coach: Amelia Valverde

The final squad was announced on 17 January 2020.

Haiti
Head coach:  Laurent Mortel

The final squad was announced on 18 January 2020. Tabita Joseph and Angeline Gustave withdrew injured and were replaced respectively by Maudeline Moryl and Gaëlle Dumas on 27 January 2020.

Panama
Head coach: Kenneth Winslow Zseremeta

The final squad was announced on 18 January 2020.

United States
Head coach:  Vlatko Andonovski

The final squad was announced on 17 January 2020.

Group B

Canada
Head coach:  Kenneth Heiner-Møller

The final squad was announced on 21 January 2020.

Jamaica
Head coach:  Hubert Busby Jr.

The final squad was announced on 16 January 2020. However, midfielder Chyanne Dennis was later replaced by Sydney Schneider due to the requirement of three goalkeepers in the squad.

Mexico
Head coach: Christopher Cuéllar

The final squad was announced on 15 January 2020.

Saint Kitts and Nevis
Head coach:  Deborah Jené Baclawski

The final squad was announced on 21 January 2020.

References

External links
Concacaf Women's Olympic Qualifying, CONCACAF.com

Squads